Nelenite is a rare manganese iron phyllosilicate arsenate mineral found in Franklin Furnace, New Jersey.

Discovery and occurrence
It was first describe in 1984 for an occurrence in the Trotter Mine, Franklin Mining District, Sussex County, New Jersey. It was named for Joseph A. Nelen of the Smithsonian Institution. It has also been reported from Montgomery County, Virginia and the Suceava district of Romania. At the type locality in New Jersey it occurs associated with actinolite, calcite, willemite, tirodite, rhodonite, apatite, lennilenapeite,
stilpnomelane, microcline and talc.

References 

Phyllosilicates
Monoclinic minerals
Minerals in space group 12